Propylparaben, the n-propyl ester of p-hydroxybenzoic acid, occurs as a natural substance found in many plants and some insects, although it is manufactured synthetically for use in cosmetics, pharmaceuticals, and foods. It is a member of the class of parabens.  It is a preservative typically found in many water-based cosmetics, such as creams, lotions, shampoos, and bath products.  As a food additive, it has the E number E216.

Sodium propyl p-hydroxybenzoate, the sodium salt of propylparaben, a compound with formula Na(C3H7(C6H4COO)O), is also used similarly as a food additive and as an anti-fungal preservation agent. Its E number is E217.

In 2010 the European Union Scientific Committee on Consumer Safety stated that it considered the use of butylparaben and propylparaben as preservatives in finished cosmetic products as safe to the consumer, as long as the sum of their concentrations does not exceed 0.19%.

Uses 
Propylparaben has antifungal and antimicrobial properties and is typically used in a variety of water-based cosmetics and personal-care products. It is also used as a food additive, and is designated with E number E216. Propylparaben is also a Standardized Chemical Allergen and is used in allergenic testing.

References 

Parabens
Propyl esters

ja:プロピルパラベン